The Genocide Machine is a Big Finish Productions audio drama based on the long-running British science fiction television series Doctor Who. It forms the first serial in the Dalek Empire arc, which continues in The Apocalypse Element and The Mutant Phase. It concludes in The Time of the Daleks.

Synopsis
On the planet Kar-Charrat, the Seventh Doctor and Ace try to prevent the Daleks acquiring a technology called the Wetworks Facility.

This episode addresses issues of scientific ethics.

Plot
Bev Tarrant and her salvage team arrive on the apparently uninhabited planet Kar-Charrat, in order to take possession of the mysterious and valuable Ziggurat. They soon discover though that there are Daleks on the planet, and maybe other creatures too.

In the TARDIS, Ace finds some overdue library books which the Doctor explains are from the library on Kar-Charrat. They travel to the planet in order to return the books. The Doctor enters the library where he meets an old friend, the chief librarian Elgin. Ace dislikes Elgin because he is not keen for people to actually touch any of the library's vast collection of books. She gets fed up and leaves to go back to the TARDIS. Elgin gives her a DNA tag which would allow her to re-enter the library. Elgin shows the Doctor the amazing technological development housed at the library — the wetworks facility. The Doctor is not particularly impressed until Elgin reveals to him that it contains all the knowledge in the Universe. The Doctor comments that not even the Time Lords had made such a break through using that technology, which is why the Matrix was built. Elgin mentions that aggressive aliens had been making threats against the library, and the Doctor eventually gets out of him that it is the Daleks.

Ace makes her way back to the TARDIS, but on the way hears a scream, and going to investigate finds Bev Tarrant. When Ace describes the library to her, she is incredulous because to her the planet seems uninhabited. She does however agree to go back with Ace, but they are caught by a Special Weapons Dalek.

The Daleks had used time corridor technology to deploy Daleks on every planet in the sector, and then waited hundreds of years to capture a time-sensitive Time Lord in order to penetrate the library's defences and allow them to seize the wetworks facility. Instead, the Daleks create a duplicate of Ace, which — replete with the DNA tag — will be able to get through the library's barriers.

The Doctor sets out to find Ace and eventually finds her and Bev. After they have been brought back to the library, the Doctor leaves again to investigate the Ziggurat. However he does not realise the Ace left behind is in fact the duplicate. He discovers that the Ziggurat is in fact a Dalek hibernation unit, triggered to awaken the Daleks when the sound of the TARDIS was heard. He then sees the duplication machine and realises the truth about Ace. He and Elgin rush back to the library, but before they arrive, a Dalek battle cruiser lands at the library where the duplicate Ace has lowered the temporal shield.

The Doctor heads back to the TARDIS with Elgin, the only course of action left open to him is to send an emergency message to the Time Lords. However, they arrive at the TARDIS to find it surrounded by Daleks, including the Dalek Supreme, and are forced to surrender. The Doctor is vital to the Daleks' plan as they could not download the knowledge of the Wetworks into a Dalek mind without a Time Lord's neural buffers. They take him to the facility, and connecting him to the machinery, they successfully download the entire knowledge of the Universe into a Dalek test subject. After the download is complete, Elgin thinks that the Doctor has been killed by the pain of the procedure.

Meanwhile, Ace and Bev realise that mysterious noises they had overheard in the rainfall were in fact some kind of life form. Bev had seen her colleague Rappell, who had been exterminated, in what she thought was a dream. His body had been possessed by the creatures. Whilst the Daleks' download of the Wetworks is occurring, Rappell arrives and proceeds to rescue them, but they soon come face to face with the Dalek test-subject, ready to exterminate them…

The test-subject is out of control and disoriented after the download and misses completely when it tries to exterminate Ace, Ben and Rappell. It shoots a hole in the wall of the library, through which Ace and Bev make their escape, but Rappell stays behind to cover them and is exterminated. However, when the Dalek pursues the women, a heavy fall of rain falls on the Dalek. The rain contains the native creatures of Kar-Charrat, and they are able to penetrate the casing and kill the Dalek.

The Doctor finds his consciousness still alive inside the Wetworks where he discovers to his outrage that the wetworks technology is based on the enslavement of the Kar-Charratians. The creatures are able to download the Doctor's mind back into his body, and he swears to free them. Soon reunited with Ace, Elgin and Bev, he plans to free the Kar-Charratians from the Wetworks by allowing Ace to use Nitro-9 on the library building. Elgin expresses remorse to the Doctor about the enslavement of the Kar-Charratians not realising that they were sentient, but the Doctor is not moved as the librarian and his people had not even tried to communicate with the natives.

Trying to allow the Doctor to re-enter the surrounded TARDIS, the Kar-Charratians kill the Daleks surrounding the time machine, but the duplicate Ace arrives. The duplicate is impervious to the rain unlike the Daleks, and threatens to kill Elgin. However, the chief cataloguer Prink rushes to his aid and attacks the duplicate, damaging it. Although Prink was killed by the duplicate, the damage allowed the Kar-Charratians to penetrate the duplicate's insides, and they succeed in destroying it.

The Doctor proceeds to the Wetworks with the intention of destroying it, using Ace to pretend to be her own duplicate to get past the Daleks. At the facility they encounter the Dalek test-subject and the Dalek Supreme arguing. Having obtained something of a conscience,  the test-subject was refusing to destroy the Wetworks facility against the Supreme's orders. When Ace places Nitro-9 on the Wetworks facility, the test-subject fires at the Supreme to prevent it exterminating her. The Dalek Supreme retreats to its mother-ship leaving the Special Weapons Dalek to kill the test-subject, but the Nitro-9 succeeds in blowing up the machinery of the Wetworks, and the Kar-Charratians manage to escape. The remaining Daleks on the planet are drowned by the newly free natives.

The TARDIS returns to the ruins of the library, and Ace and the Doctor ponder on whether the test-subject Dalek with the complete knowledge of the universe and a moral consciousness could have heralded a new era for the Doctor. Elgin rues the destruction of his life's work, but out of guilt for his treatment of the Kar-Charratians realises it was a crime. Reporting its failure to the Dalek Emperor on Skaro, the Dalek Supreme is ordered to self-destruct. The Emperor is not totally despondent, however, as it has more plans to extend the Dalek Empire…

Cast
The Doctor — Sylvester McCoy
Ace — Sophie Aldred
Rappell — Daniel Gabriele
Bev Tarrant — Louise Faulkner
Chief Librarian Elgin — Bruce Montague
Cataloguer Prink — Nicholas Briggs
Dalek Voices — Alistair Lock and Nicholas Briggs
Phantom Voices — Daniel Gabriele

Trivia
The character of Bev Tarrant makes a further appearance in Dust Breeding as well as in the Bernice Summerfield audio drama, The Bellotron Incident.
This story forms the first serial in the Dalek Empire arc, a storyline that begins here with the Seventh Doctor, continues with the Sixth Doctor (The Apocalypse Element) and Fifth (The Mutant Phase) and concludes with the Eighth (The Time of the Daleks).  Elements from these stories tie in the Dalek Empire series.
This story was the first appearance of the Daleks in Big Finish audio plays.
The working title of this story was Wetworks and it is also named as such in trailers at the end of some of the preceding audio dramas in the Big Finish series.
The idea of a library with all knowledge contained within would be used again in the 2008 TV episodes "Silence in the Library" and "Forest of the Dead" starring the Tenth Doctor and Donna. It was also an idea used in the Sixth Doctor novel Spiral Scratch.
This episode is the first instance of the Daleks being voiced by Nicholas Briggs, who would go on to voice the Daleks in the 2005 revival of Doctor Who starting with Series 1 episode "Dalek".

External links
Big Finish Productions – The Genocide Machine

Seventh Doctor audio plays
Dalek audio plays
2000 audio plays